Ian Edward Heinisch (born August 5, 1988) is an American mixed martial artist currently competing in the middleweight division of the Ultimate Fighting Championship. A professional since 2015, he has also competed for the World Series of Fighting and Legacy Fighting Alliance, where he is the former Interim Middleweight Champion.

Background 
Heinisch, who is a Colorado native, was diagnosed with ADHD when he was young. His parents home schooled him and placed him in wrestling classes as he had too much energy and could not pay attention in school. He won the Colorado state high school championship and was an All-American twice. He went on to wrestle at North Idaho College but dropped out of school and originally moved to Vancouver, working as a door-to-door salesman before being deported for working illegally. Upon returning to the United States, Heinisch started selling ecstasy pills to keep up with his lifestyle after his parents lost their house and got divorced.  He was arrested for selling 2,000 ecstasy pills and headed to Amsterdam to avoid a jail sentence after meeting bail. He ended up working in a bar in Spain and sleeping on the beach for three months. Not long after Heinisch started drug trafficking from South America to Spain and got caught on one of his trips when a Spanish immigration officer found one kilo of cocaine on him. Heinisch ended up in prison at Canary Islands. He taught himself how to speak Spanish by reading a Spanish bible with an English dictionary and taking up boxing. After he finished serving his prison sentence in Spain, Heinisch flew back to New York where he was apprehended upon re-entry to United States for fleeing the country back in 2009. He turned his life around after finishing his sentence at Rikers Island in the United States and pursued an MMA career.

Mixed martial arts career

Early career
Heinisch started his professional MMA career in 2015 and fought under various promotions, namely Sparta Combat League, and Legacy Fighting Alliance where he was the interim middleweight champion after defeating Gabriel Checco and was promoted to middleweight champion after Anthony Hernandez vacated the title in June 2018 when he signed with the UFC. He amassed a record of 10-1 prior to competing in Dana White's Contender Series. Heinisch was nearly cast for The Ultimate Fighter: Team Joanna vs. Team Cláudia as a light heavyweight, however, due to paperwork issues from his time in Spain ultimately prevented him from competing.

Dana White's Contender Series
Heinisch appeared in Dana White's Contender Series 15 web-series program on July 31, 2018, facing Justin Sumter. He won the fight via knockout in the first round and was signed by UFC.

Ultimate Fighting Championship
Heinisch made his UFC debut on November 17, 2018, against Cezar Ferreira, replacing injured Tom Breese at UFC Fight Night: Magny vs. Ponzinibbio. He won the fight via unanimous decision.

His next fight came on May 18, 2019, at UFC Fight Night: dos Anjos vs. Lee against Antônio Carlos Júnior He won the fight via unanimous decision.

Heinisch faced Derek Brunson on August 17, 2019, at UFC 241. He lost the fight via unanimous decision.

Heinisch was expected to face Brad Tavares on October 26, 2019, at UFC Fight Night 162 However, Heinisch was removed from the pairing in early October for undisclosed reasons. In turn, Tavares was removed from the event entirely and rescheduled to face Edmen Shahbazyan a week later at UFC 244.

Heinisch faced Omari Akhmedov on December 14, 2019, at UFC 245. He lost the fight via unanimous decision.

On March 31, 2020, Heinisch revealed that after fighting out his contract, Heinisch signed a new, four-fight contract with the UFC.

Heinisch was scheduled to face Gerald Meerschaert on June 6, 2020, at UFC 250. However, two days before the fight his cornerman tested positive for COVID-19. Heinisch was pulled from the fight and replaced by promotional newcomer Anthony Ivy. Subsequently, the cornerman was re-tested and the initial test was proven to be false positive and Heinisch was reinstated to the card. Finally, Heinisch faced Meerschaert as originally scheduled and won the fight via TKO in the first round.

Heinisch was scheduled to face  Brendan Allen on June 27, 2020, at UFC on ESPN: Poirier vs. Hooker. However, Heinisch pulled out of the matchup in mid-June citing an injury and was replaced by promotional newcomer Kyle Daukaus. The bout between Heinisch and Allen was rescheduled again on November 7, 2020, at UFC on ESPN: Santos vs. Teixeira. On the day of the event, the UFC announced the bout was once again canceled due to Heinisch testing  positive for COVID-19.

Heinisch was scheduled to face Kelvin Gastelum on January 30, 2021, at UFC Fight Night 186. On December 26, 2020, it was announced that the bout had moved to UFC 258 on February 13, 2021. Heinisch lost the fight via unanimous decision.

Heinisch faced Nassourdine Imavov on July 24, 2021, at UFC on ESPN: Sandhagen vs. Dillashaw. He lost the fight via technical knockout in round two.

Heinisch was scheduled to face Sam Alvey on February 5, 2022, at UFC Fight Night 200. Heinisch pulled out due to undisclosed reasons in late December and was replaced by Phil Hawes.

Championships and achievements 
 Legacy Fighting Alliance
 LFA Middleweight Champion (One time; former)

Mixed martial arts record 

|-
|Loss
|align=center|14–5
|Nassourdine Imavov
|TKO (knee and punches)
|UFC on ESPN: Sandhagen vs. Dillashaw
|
|align=center|2
|align=center|3:09
|Las Vegas, Nevada, United States
|
|-
|Loss
|align=center|14–4
|Kelvin Gastelum
|Decision (unanimous)
|UFC 258
|
|align=center|3
|align=center|5:00
|Las Vegas, Nevada, United States
|
|-
|Win
|align=center|14–3
|Gerald Meerschaert
|TKO (punches)
|UFC 250
|
|align=center|1
|align=center|1:14
|Las Vegas, Nevada, United States
|
|-
|Loss
|align=center|13–3
|Omari Akhmedov
|Decision (unanimous)
|UFC 245
|
|align=center|3
|align=center|5:00
|Las Vegas, Nevada, United States
|
|-
|Loss
|align=center|13–2
|Derek Brunson
|Decision (unanimous)
|UFC 241
|
|align=center|3
|align=center|5:00
|Anaheim, California, United States
|
|-
|Win
|align=center|13–1
|Antônio Carlos Júnior
|Decision (unanimous)
|UFC Fight Night: dos Anjos vs. Lee
|
|align=center|3
|align=center|5:00
|Rochester, New York, United States
|
|-
|Win
|align=center|12–1
|Cezar Ferreira
|Decision (unanimous)
|UFC Fight Night: Magny vs. Ponzinibbio
|
|align=center|3
|align=center|5:00
|Buenos Aires, Argentina
|
|-
|Win
|align=center|11–1
|Justin Sumter
|KO (elbows)
|Dana White's Contender Series 15
|
|align=center|1
|align=center|3:37
|Las Vegas, Nevada, United States
|
|-
|Win
|align=center|10–1
|Gabriel Checco
|KO (punches)
|LFA 39
|
|align=center|1
|align=center|3:44
|Vail, Colorado, United States
|
|-
|Win
|align=center|9–1
|Daniel Madrid
|KO (punch)
|LFA 31
|
|align=center|1
|align=center|3:44
|Phoenix, Arizona, United States
|
|-
|Loss
|align=center|8–1
|Markus Perez
|Submission (arm-triangle choke)
|LFA 22
|
|align=center|1
|align=center|2:14
|Broomfield, Colorado, United States
|
|-
|Win
|align=center|8–0
|Lucas Rota
|Submission (scarf hold armlock)
|LFA 10
|
|align=center|1
|align=center|2:38
|Pueblo, Colorado, United States
|
|-
|Win
|align=center|7–0
|Hayward Charles
|Decision (unanimous)
|SCL 53
|
|align=center|3
|align=center|5:00
|Denver, Colorado, United States
|
|-
|Win
|align=center|6–0
|Jeremy Spelts
|Submission (scarf hold armlock)
|SCL: AVM 7
|
|align=center|1
|align=center|4:34
|Loveland, Colorado, United States
|
|-
|Win
|align=center|5–0
|Tyler Vogel
|Decision (unanimous)
|WSOF 29
|
|align=center|3
|align=center|5:00
|Greeley, Colorado, United States
|
|-
|Win
|align=center|4–0
|Kris Hocum
|Decision (unanimous)
|SCL 45
|
|align=center|3
|align=center|5:00
|Denver, Colorado, United States
|
|-
|Win
|align=center|3–0
|Zack Wells
|Decision (unanimous)
|SCL 42
|
|align=center|3
|align=center|5:00
|Castle Rock, Colorado, United States
|
|-
|Win
|align=center|2–0
|Canaan Grigsby
|Decision (unanimous)
|SCL: Army vs. Marines 6
|
|align=center|3
|align=center|5:00
|Loveland, Colorado, United States
|
|-
|Win
|align=center|1–0
|Dante Florez
|TKO (punches)
|SCL 40
|
|align=center|1
|align=center|3:06
|Denver, Colorado, United States
|
|-

See also 
 List of current UFC fighters
 List of male mixed martial artists

References

External links 
 
 

1988 births
Living people
Lightweight mixed martial artists
Mixed martial artists utilizing wrestling
Mixed martial artists utilizing Brazilian jiu-jitsu
Sportspeople from Denver
Mixed martial artists from Colorado
American male mixed martial artists
American practitioners of Brazilian jiu-jitsu
Ultimate Fighting Championship male fighters